The School for Wives is a theatrical comedy written by the seventeenth century French playwright Molière and considered by some critics to be one of his finest achievements. It was first staged at the Palais Royal theatre on 26 December 1662 for the brother of the King. The play depicts a character who is so intimidated by femininity that he resolves to marry his young, naïve ward and proceeds to make clumsy advances to this purpose. It raised some outcry from the public and established Molière as a bold playwright who would not be afraid to write about controversial issues. In June 1663, the playwright cunningly responded to the uproar with another piece entitled La Critique de L'École des femmes, which provided some insight into his unique style of comedy.

Characters and scene
Its characters include:
Arnolphe: also known as Monsieur de la Souche
Agnès: an innocent young girl, Arnolphe's ward
Horace: Agnès's lover, Oronte's son
Alain: a peasant, Arnolphe's manservant
Georgette: a peasant woman, servant to Arnolphe
Chrysalde: a friend of Arnolphe's
Enrique: Chrysalde's brother-in-law, Agnès's father
Oronte: Horace's father and Arnolphe's old friend
A notary

The scene is a square in a provincial town.

Plot
Arnolphe, the protagonist, is a mature man who has groomed the young Agnès since she was 4 years old. Arnolphe supports Agnès living in a nunnery until the age of 17, when he moves her to one of his abodes, which he keeps under the name of Monsieur de la Souche. Arnolphe's intention is to bring up Agnès in such a manner that she will be too ignorant to be unfaithful to him and he becomes obsessed with avoiding this fate. To this end, he forbids the nuns who are instructing her from teaching her anything that might lead her astray. Right from the very first scene, a friend of his, Chrysalde, warns Arnolphe that such a scheme will likely fail, but Arnolphe takes no heed.

After Agnès moves into Arnolphe's house, Arnolphe meets by chance Horace, the young son of Arnolphe's friend Oronte, whom Arnolphe had not seen in years. Not realizing that Arnolphe and Monsieur de la Souche are the same person, Horace unwittingly confides to Arnolphe he had been visiting Agnès for the past week while the master of the house, one Monsieur de la Souche, was away.

Arnolphe then schemes to outmaneuver Horace and to ensure that Agnès will marry him.

Arnolphe becomes more and more frustrated as the play goes on. Agnès continues to meet with Horace despite Arnolphe's displeasure until, finally, a misunderstanding leads Arnolphe to believe that Agnès has agreed to marry him and Agnès to believe that Arnolphe has given her permission to marry Horace. When they realize the actual situation, Arnolphe forbids Agnès from seeing Horace. Horace, in his distress, comes to Arnolphe, asking for his help in rescuing Agnès from "Monsieur de la Souche".

In the final act Oronte and Enrique arrive and announce that Horace is to marry Enrique's daughter. The daughter turns out to be Agnès, rendering all of Arnolphe's scheming useless.

Theatrical productions
 The Compagnie Jouvet of Paris staged the play at the first Edinburgh International Festival in 1947
 Let Wives Tak Tent, a free translation into Scots by Robert Kemp, was first performed at the Gateway Theatre in Edinburgh in 1948
 First produced on Broadway, performed in French, with Louis Jouvet at the ANTA Playhouse from 18 March to 3 April 1951.
 A production using the Richard Wilbur translation was staged at the Lyceum Theatre, on Broadway from 16 February to 29 May 1971, directed by Stephen Porter, with cast members Brian Bedford as Arnolphe, Joan Van Ark as Agnes, and David Dukes as Horace.
 In 1983 Ingmar Bergman directed a TV version of the play, starring Allan Edwall as Arnolphe, Lena Nyman as Agnes, and Stellan Skarsgård as Horace.

Audio recordings
The play was adapted for audio in 1965 by Daniel Bernet, in a production directed by Bertrand Jérome, with music by Michel Puig, starring François Périer as Arnolfe, issued on the Sonores Bordas label.
 In 1971, Caedmon Records recorded and released on LP (TRS 344) a production originally performed at the Lyceum Theatre in New York City using the Richard Wilbur translation and directed by Stephen Porter.  The cast included Brian Bedford as Arnolphe, Joan Van Ark as Agnes and David Dukes as Horace. This recording has not to date been re-released on CD.
 In 2009, L.A. Theatre Works recorded a production using the Richard Wilbur translation featuring William Brown as Arnolphe and Judy Greer as Agnes.

References

External links
 
 Plot overview 

 Theatre History

1662 plays
Plays by Molière